This is a summary of significant events in music in 1993.

Specific locations
1993 in British music
1993 in Norwegian music

Specific genres
1993 in country music
1993 in heavy metal music
1993 in hip hop music
1993 in Latin music
1993 in jazz

Events

January–February
January 8 – The U.S. Postal Service issues an Elvis Presley stamp. The design was voted on in February 1992.
January 9 – The Bodyguard: Original Soundtrack Album becomes the first album in history, since the Nielsen SoundScan introduced a computerized sales monitoring system in May 1992, to sell over 1 million copies in one week in the US.
January 12 – Cream reunites for a performance at their Rock and Roll Hall of Fame induction ceremony in Los Angeles, USA. Other inductees include Creedence Clearwater Revival, Ruth Brown, The Doors, Van Morrison, and Sly & The Family Stone.
January 13 – Bobby Brown is arrested in Augusta, Georgia, USA for simulating a sex act onstage.
January 24–February 1 – The Big Day Out festival takes place in Australia, expanding from its original Sydney venue to include Melbourne, Perth and Adelaide. The festival is headlined by Iggy Pop and Sonic Youth.
January 25 – Musician and anti-government activist Fela Anikulapo-Kuti is charged with murder and conspiracy after (according to the Nigerian police) an electrician was beaten to death at his home by his bodyguards.
January 31 – Michael Jackson plays the halftime show of Super Bowl XXVII. The performance is a ratings success and begins a trend of the NFL signing big-name acts to play at the Super Bowl in order to increase the spectacle and hype surrounding the game.
February 10 – Oprah Winfrey interviews Michael Jackson during a US television prime time special. It becomes one of the most watched interviews in television history and is Jackson's first in fourteen years.
February 14 – Harry Nilsson suffers a non-fatal heart attack.
February 24 – The 35th Annual Grammy Awards are presented in Los Angeles, hosted by Garry Shandling. Eric Clapton wins six awards out of nine nominations.

March–April
March 4 – Patti LaBelle receives a star on the Hollywood Walk of Fame in Hollywood, USA.
March 6 – Whitney Houston's single "I Will Always Love You" posts its 14th week at number one in the US.
March 20–28 – The second Kempsey Country Music Heritage Week is held in Kempsey, New South Wales.
March 22 – Depeche Mode hits number one in U.S on the Billboard 200 with the album Songs of Faith and Devotion.
March 23 – Luciano Pavarotti undergoes surgery in Rome to remove part of the cartilage in his right knee, after cancelling his La Scala debut of I Pagliacci when he could no longer stand because of acute pain.
March 29 – Suede release their eponymous debut album. It enters the album chart at number 1 in the UK, setting a new record for the fastest-selling debut album by a UK act in Britain.
April 12
Actress Lisa Bonet files for divorce from Lenny Kravitz, after a two-year separation.
The Grateful Dead sing "The Star-Spangled Banner" at the San Francisco Giants' home opener at Candlestick Park.
April 17 – The Bangles' Susanna Hoffs marries screenwriter Jay Roach in Los Angeles, USA.
April 21 – Former Rolling Stones bassist Bill Wyman marries designer Suzanne Accosta in France.
April 22 – The Who's Tommy opens on Broadway.
April 24 – Willie Nelson, John Cougar Mellencamp, Neil Young and more than 30 other artists perform at Farm Aid 6 in Ames, Iowa, US.
April 29 – An animated version of Barry White appears on an episode of the US television cartoon series, The Simpsons.

May–June
May 6 – A government official announced that the Malaysian cabinet will commission musicians to speed up the tempo of the country's national anthem in an effort to make it more dynamic.
May 10 – Hugh Whitaker, former drummer of The Housemartins, is sentenced to six years in jail for attacking an ex–business partner with an axe.
May 15 – The 1993 Eurovision Song Contest, held at Green Glens Arena in Millstreet, Ireland, is won by singer Niamh Kavanagh, representing the host country with the song "In Your Eyes". Ireland equal France and Luxembourg's tally of five total Eurovision victories.
 Janet Jackson's "That's The Way Love Goes" reaches number one on the Billboard Hot 100 and spends eight consecutive weeks at the top spot.
May 18 - Janet Jackson releases her 5th studio album titled Janet. It becomes her 3rd consecutive album to debut at number one on the Billboard 200, becoming the first album by a female artist to debut at number one in the Nielsen SoundScan Era. It also becomes the highest first week album sales by a female artist in history during that time, selling 350,000 copies.
May 27 – June 6 – The second Brisbane Biennial International Music Festival is held.
June 7
On his 35th birthday, Prince announces that he is changing his name to an unpronounceable symbol. This led to him being called The Artist Formerly Known as Prince until 2000.

July–August
July 7 – Singer Mia Zapata of punk band The Gits is found dead after being beaten, sexually assaulted and strangled in the Capitol Hill district of Seattle. Her murder goes unsolved for a decade until DNA evidence leads to an arrest and conviction.
July 17 – Guns N' Roses play the final gig on their Use Your Illusion Tour. This will be the last time the original band plays together on stage until 2016.
July 18 – At a Lollapalooza concert in Philadelphia, Rage Against the Machine uses their entire 14-minute performance time to protest their single "Killing in the Name" being banned from radio. With only guitar feedback for sound, the group appears on stage naked with the letters "PMRC" painted on their chests and electrical duct tape over their mouths.
July 21 – Ilaiyaraaja becomes the first Asian composer to have a symphony performed by a major UK orchestra (Royal Philharmonic Orchestra).
August 3 – Aharon Gorev's Klezmer Symphony, the first of its kind, is featured on the opening concert of the sixth annual International Klezmer Festival in Safed, Israel. 
August 5 – Singer Natalie Merchant announces on MTV that she is leaving 10,000 Maniacs after 12 years in the band.
August 10 – Mayhem guitarist Euronymous is stabbed to death by fellow band member Varg Vikernes in Oslo, Norway, causing the temporary end of Mayhem.
August 24 – News breaks to the public that Michael Jackson is being investigated on allegations of child molestation.
August 28 – Bruce Dickinson plays his final show with Iron Maiden (until his return in 1999) in London. The show is broadcast on British television, and later released on VHS and DVD.

September–October
September 2 – Snoop Dogg and his bodyguard are charged with the August 25 murder of a 20-year-old gang member in a drive-by shooting. They are cleared of the charges in 1996.
September 14 – A civil lawsuit is filed against Michael Jackson by thirteen-year-old Jordan Chandler and his parents, accusing the singer of sexually abusing the boy over the course of their friendship.
September 20 – Depeche Mode becomes among the earliest bands to go on the Internet to interact with fans, as the group holds a question-and-answer session on AOL. The event is marred by technical difficulties as many participants, including the band members themselves, have trouble logging on to the chat.
September 25 – Madonna starts The Girlie Show World Tour in London, England. And visit some countries for the very first time like Brazil, Argentina, Israel, Turkey, Puerto Rico, Mexico and Australia.
September 30 – October 2 – The Abu Ghosh Vocal Music Festival is held, featuring music of Jewish, Christian, and Moslem cultural traditions, and a performance of Handel's Messiah by the Ave Sol Choir from Riga and the Rehovot Camerata Orchestra directed by Avner Biron.
October 1 – MTV Latin America is launched.
October 1–3 – Annual Australian Bush Music Festival takes place in Glen Innes.
October 17 – Savatage guitarist and co-founder Christopher Michael "Criss" Oliva killed in a car accident.
October 31 – Tupac Shakur is arrested and charged with shooting two off-duty police officers in Atlanta. The charges are later dropped.

November–December
November 6–7 – The second annual Tooheys Sydney Country Music Festival, is held at Clarendon (Hawkesbury) Racecourse, in Sydney.
November 11 – Michael Jackson ends his Dangerous World Tour in Mexico City, Mexico.
November 12 – Sir Peter Maxwell Davies, responding to an announcement by the Arts Council that they would fund only two of London's four orchestras starting in 1994, confirms he plans to hand back his knighthood and consider leaving the country if this support were to be withdrawn. 
November 18 – Nirvana play their unplugged concert in New York for MTV.
November 19 – Pearl Jam singer Eddie Vedder is arrested in New Orleans, USA on charges of public drunkenness after a bar room brawl.
November 19 – Madonna ends her tour in Tokyo, Japan.
November 24 - Janet Jackson begins her Janet World Tour in Cincinnati, Ohio. The opening concert was covered by MTV in a television special featuring brief live performances and coverage from the show.
December 22 – Michael Jackson makes his first public statement regarding the child molestation allegations leveled against him. In a videotaped address, Jackson calls the accusations "totally false" and asks the public to "wait to hear the truth before you label or condemn me."
December 31 – The 22nd annual New Year's Rockin' Eve special airs on ABC, with appearances by Brooks & Dunn, Daryl Hall, Kiss, Joey Lawrence, SWV, and Barry Manilow.

Also in 1993
Rick Astley retires from the music industry at the age of 27 after selling 40 million records in a five-year period.
Keiko Abe becomes the first woman to be inducted into the Percussive Arts Society Hall of Fame.

Bands formed
See Musical groups established in 1993

Bands disbanded
See Musical groups disestablished in 1993

Bands reformed

Big Star
Luv'
Steely Dan
The Seekers

Albums released

January–March

April–June

July–September

October–December

Release date unknown

Alice in Wonderland No. 5 – Randy Greif
Amon: Feasting the Beast – Deicide
And the Forests Dream Eternally – Behemoth
Anthem for a New Tomorrow – Screeching Weasel
Attitude – April Wine
Belgium...One Point – Telex
Blood Music – Chapterhouse
Bridges to Bert – Leftover Salmon
Classics – Model 500
Chronologie – Jean Michel Jarre
Demoluca – Pezz (Billy Talent)
!!Destroy-Oh-Boy!! – New Bomb Turks
The Downward Road – The Pursuit of Happiness
Dragonfly Summer – Michael Franks
Footsoldier in the Moonlight – Donnie Iris
Four – Seaweed
From the Vaults – Nazareth
The Gods of Earth and Heaven – Army of Lovers
Golden Feelings – Beck
Great Big Sea – Great Big Sea
Heartbeat – Hank Marvin
Is It ... Man or Astroman? – Man or Astro-man?
It Is the Business of the Future to Be Dangerous – Hawkwind
Jackpot Plus! – Jawbox
Jericho – Prism
Kings & Queens – Sham 69

Live at the Royal Albert Hall – Emerson, Lake & Palmer
Love Makes No Sense – Alexander O'Neal
Mr. Mention – Buju Banton
Najgolemi Hitovi (Greatest Hits) – Ferus Mustafov
Near Death Experience – Cro-Mags
Original Dubliners – The Dubliners
Our Bodies Our Selves – The Mr. T Experience
Out the Shizzy – 7 Seconds
Piss – Slank
Quetzacoatl – J Church
Reason Street – Carolyne Mas
Reasons – Al Denson
The Serpentine Similar – Gastr del Sol
Shiva Space Machine – Me Mom and Morgentaler
Sound as Ever – You Am I
Space Is the Place – Sun Ra
Super Tasty – Gumball
Take the Leap! – Toyah
This Should Not Be – Bo Diddley
Tribal Thunder – Dick Dale
Ultraelectromagneticpop! – Eraserheads
Perverse – Jesus Jones
Ultimate Alternative Wavers – Built to Spill
Vampire on Titus – Guided by Voices
What You Hear Is What You Get: The Best of Bad Company – Bad Company
Wiggle – Screeching Weasel

Biggest hit singles
The following songs achieved the highest chart positions
in the charts of 1993.

Top 40 Chart hit singles

Other Chart hit singles

Notable singles

Other Notable singles

Top 10 selling albums of the year
  The Bodyguard: Original Soundtrack Album – Whitney Houston
  Breathless – Kenny G
  Unplugged - Eric Clapton
  janet. – Janet Jackson
  Some Gave All – Billy Ray Cyrus
  The Chronic – Dr. Dre
  Pocket Full Of Kryptonite – Spin Doctors
  Ten – Pearl Jam
  The Chase – Garth Brooks
  Core – Stone Temple Pilots

Top 10 best albums of the Year
All albums have been named albums of the year for their hits in the charts.
 Nirvana – In Utero
 The Smashing Pumpkins – Siamese Dream
 Wu-Tang Clan – Enter the Wu-Tang (36 Chambers)
 Pearl Jam – Vs.
 Counting Crows – August and Everything After
 Björk – Debut
 Blur – Modern Life is Rubbish
 Liz Phair – Exile in Guyville
 Suede – Suede
 Slowdive – Souvlaki

Classical music
John Adams – Violin Concerto
Mounir Anastas – Né du néant for alto saxophone & fixed media
Luciano Berio – Rage and Outrage
Pierre Boulez – ...explosante-fixe... (fourth version)
Alvin Curran – VSTO (string quartet)
Michael Daugherty – Bizarro
Mario Davidovsky – Shulamit's Dream for soprano and orchestra
David Diamond – Symphony No. 11
Joël-François Durand – Concerto for Piano and Orchestra
Ivan Fedele – Piano Concerto
Lorenzo Ferrero
Introito (from "Requiem per le vittime della mafia")
Maschere (incidental music)
Philip Glass – In the Summer House, incidental music
Vinko Globokar – Discours IX , for two pianos
Klaus Huber – Winter Seeds, for accordion
Houtaf Khoury
Concerto No. 1, for viola and orchestra
Intermezzo, for large orchestra
Sonate-Poème, for violin and piano
String Quartet No. 2
Cantata, for baritone and large orchestra
Piece, for piano
Frederik Magle – Symphony for organ No. 2, Let There Be Light
Krzysztof Penderecki – Polish Requiem (revised version)
R. Murray Schafer – Concerto for Accordion and Orchestra
Harold Schiffmann – Sestetto concertato
Alfred Schnittke
Symphony No. 7
Concerto Grosso No. 6 for piano, violin and string orchestra
Peer Gynt: Epiloque, for violoncello, piano and tape
Improvisation, for solo cello
Karlheinz Stockhausen – Helikopter-Streichquartett
Bent Sørensen – Sterbende Gärten for violin and orchestra
Takashi Yoshimatsu – Concerto for Trombone, Op. 55, Orion Machine

Opera
Daron Hagen – Shining Brow
Theo Loevendie – Gassir, the Hero
Michael Nyman – Noises, Sounds & Sweet Airs
Randolph Peters – Nosferatu
Steve Reich – The Cave
Alfred Schnittke – Gesualdo
Karlheinz Stockhausen – Dienstag aus Licht (May 28, Leipzig Opera)
Hugo Weisgall – Esther (October, New York City Opera)

Jazz

Musical theater
Annie Warbucks—off-Broadway production
Blood Brothers (Willy Russell) – Broadway production opened at the Music Box Theatre and ran for 840 performances
Cyrano: The Musical—Broadway production opened at the Neil Simon Theatre and ran for 137 performances
The Goodbye Girl—Broadway production opened at the Marquis Theatre and ran for 188 performances 
Joseph and the Amazing Technicolor Dreamcoat—Broadway revival
Kiss of the Spider Woman—Broadway production opened at the Broadhurst Theatre and ran for 904 performances
My Fair Lady (Lerner & Loewe) – Broadway revival
She Loves Me—Broadway revival

Musical films
CB4 (United States)
Funes, a Great Love (Funes, un gran amor) (Argentina)
Gypsy, starring Bette Midler (United States)
Half Japanese: The Band That Would Be King
Just Friends (Belgium/Netherlands)
Lotrando a Zubejda (Czech Republic)
Swing Kids
The Line, the Cross and the Curve (UK)
What's Love Got to Do with It (United States)
Zero Patience (Canada)

Births
January 2 – Bryson Tiller, American singer-songwriter
January 4 – Manu Gavassi, Brazilian singer
January 7 – Nico Santos, German singer-songwriter
January 9 - Take A Daytrip's Denzel Baptiste, American record producer and songwriter
January 12
Zayn Malik, British R&B singer, songwriter, rapper and former member of the band (One Direction)
D.O., Korean singer and actor (EXO)
January 13 – Sachika Misawa, Japanese voice actress and singer
January 14 - Molly Tuttle, an American vocalist, songwriter, banjo player and guitarist, recording artist, activist and teacher in the bluegrass tradition
January 30
Cautious Clay, American singer-songwriter and record producer
Sebastián Silva, Colombian internet personality, vlogger, actor, presenter and singer
February 6 – Tinashe, American singer-songwriter, dancer, performer and actress (The Stunners)
February 19 – Victoria Justice, American singer-songwriter and actress
February 21 - Masaki Suda, Japanese actor and singer
February 22 - Take a Daytrip's David Biral, American record producer and songwriter
March 4 – Bobbi Kristina Brown, American singer (d. 2015)
March 9 – Suga, South Korean rapper, songwriter, record producer, and member of BTS
March 15 – Alyssa Reid, Canadian singer-songwriter
March 23 - JP Saxe, Canadian singer and songwriter, collaborator with Julia Michaels
March 30 – Anitta, Brazilian singer, songwriter, actress, dancer and record producer
April 10 - Sofia Carson, American singer and actress
April 14
Graham Phillips, actor and singer
Ellington Ratliff, drummer and actor
Rozes,  American musician, singer and songwriter
April 16 – Chance the Rapper, independent American Christian rapper
April 18 – Nathan Sykes, English singer, songwriter and record producer, former member of The Wanted
April 25 – Shiloh, Canadian singer
Ashe, American singer-songwriter and musician
May 1 – Victoria Monet, American singer-songwriter and musician
May 2 – Isyana Sarasvati, Indonesian singer and songwriter
May 4 - Shygirl, an English rapper, DJ, singer, songwriter and co-head/founder of record label and collective Nuxxe
May 6 – Naomi Scott, English actress and singer
May 11 – James Reid, Filipino singer-actor
May 13
Debby Ryan, American singer and actress
Tones and I, Australian singer-songwriter
May 14 – Miranda Cosgrove, American singer and actress
May 16 – IU, Korean singer-songwriter and actress
May 17
GoldLink, American rapper
Iwamoto Hikaru, Japanese singer (Snow Man)
May 18 – Kyle, American rapper, singer and songwriter
June 6
Vic Mensa, American rapper (Kids These Days)
Tom Swoon, Polish DJ and producer
June 7 – George Ezra, English singer-songwriter and musician
June 19 - KSI, English rapper and YouTuber
June 25 – Piero Vergara, Filipino singer-songwriter and actor
June 26 – Ariana Grande, American singer-songwriter, actress, performer, musician and advocate
June 27 – Rejjie Snow, an Irish hip hop recording artist and record producer
July 2 – Saweetie, American rapper, singer and songwriter
July 3 – Vince Staples, American rapper and actor (Billie Eilish)
July 5 – Hollie Cavanagh, English-American singer
July 6 – Melissa Steel, British singer
July 7
Ally Brooke, American singer, dancer and songwriter, member of Fifth Harmony
Vintage Culture, Brazilian DJ and Producer
Capital Steez, American rapper (Pro Era) (d. 2012)
 July 8 - Alice Ivy, Australian Electric Dance artist and producer 
July 10 – Perrie Edwards, English singer-songwriter, dancer and member of Little Mix, Businesswoman
July 17 – Kali Uchis,  Colombian-American singer, songwriter, poet, record producer, music video director, and fashion designer
July 18
Lee Taemin, Korean singer (SHINee)
Casey Veggies, American rapper and songwriter
July 26
Elizabeth Gillies, American actress and singer
Taylor Momsen, American rock singer-songwriter, musician, record producer, former actress and model (The Pretty Reckless)
Stormzy, English grime and hip hop artist
July 28
Cher Lloyd, British rapper, singer-songwriter
La'Porsha Renae, American singer-songwriter and American Idol alumni
July 30 – Yohani, Sri Lankan singer, songwriter, rapper and music producer
August 6 – Yaeji, Korean-American multilingual musician and music producer
August 9 - Sampa the Great, a Zambian singer, rapper and songwriter.
August 11 – Alyson Stoner, American dancer, singer, actor, YouTuber and model
August 17 =  Mauricio Alberto "Mau" Reglero Rodríguez, member of Mau y Ricky and sons of  Argentine-Venezuelan singer Ricardo Montaner 
August 23 – Keke Palmer, American actress, singer, songwriter and presenter
August 29 – Liam Payne, British singer of the band One Direction
September 1 – Megan Nicole, American singer-songwriter and YouTuber
September 7 – Mohamed Ali, Danish singer
September 10 – Buddy (rapper), American rapper, singer, dancer and actor
September 13
Niall Horan, Irish singer, songwriter and musician (One Direction)
Alice Merton, German-Canadian-English singer and songwriter
September 16 – Tayla Parx, American RNB songwriter and producer
September 18 – Manal, Marrocan singer
September 24
Ben Platt, American singer-songwriter and actor
Alina Baraz, American RNB soul singer-songwriter
September 25 – Rosalía, Spanish singer and songwriter
October 4 – Mina, German singer
October 8 - Saucy Santana. American rapper and make up artist
October 13 – Tiffany Trump, American Georgetown Law student, singer and socialite
October 23 - Teeks, Māori soul singer
October 25 – Grandson, Canadian-American singer-songwriter and musician
November 1 – Pabllo Vittar, Brazilian singer-songwriter and drag queen
November 5 - Shy Martin, Swedish singer and songwriter
November 8 - Laycon, Nigerian rapper
November 9 - Ronen Rubinstein, an Israeli-American actor, writer, director, environmental activist and lead singer of Nights in Stereo
November 13 – Julia Michaels, American singer and songwriter
November 14 – Namasenda, Sweden singer
November 24 – Ivi Adamou, Greek Cypriot singer
November 26 – Erena Ono, Japanese singer
November 27 – Aubrey Peeples, American actress and singer
November 29 – Alex Hope, Australian ARIA and APRA Award-winning producer, songwriter, and multi-instrumentalist
December 1 - Drakeo the Ruler, American rapper and songwriter (d. 2021)
December 7 – Jasmine Villegas, American singer
December 8 – AnnaSophia Robb,  American singer and actress
December 10 – Rachel Trachtenburg, American singer and actress (Trachtenburg Family Slideshow Players and Supercute!)
December 19 – Alkaline, Jamaican dancehall musician
December 22
Ali Lohan, American actress, model and singer
Meghan Trainor, American singer-songwriter, musician and producer
December 29 – Chloe Kohanski, American singer-songwriter, 2017 American The Voice winner
December 30 – Krishane, Jamaican pop artist (Tinie Tempah, Jess Glynne)

Deaths
January 6
Dizzy Gillespie, jazz trumpet virtuoso and co-founder of bebop, 76
Rudolf Nureyev, ballet dancer,  54
January 13 – Gordon Tobing, Indonesian folk singer, 67
January 15 – Sammy Cahn, songwriter, 79
January 30 – Paulo Rosine, pianist and leader of Martinican band Malavoi
February 3 – Karel Goeyvaerts, composer, 69
February 25 – Toy Caldwell, guitarist (The Marshall Tucker Band), 45
February 26 – Pina Carmirelli, violinist, founder member of the Boccherini Quintet, 78
March 3 – Carlos Montoya, guitarist, 89
March 31 
 Mitchell Parish, 92, US lyric writer
 Nicanor Zabaleta, 86, Spanish harpist
April 19 – Steve Douglas, saxophonist, 54
April 23 – Daniel Jones, composer, 80
April 30 – Mick Ronson, guitarist, 46 (liver cancer)
May 22 – Juice Wilson, jazz violinist, 89
May 30 – Sun Ra, jazz composer, 79
June 5 – Conway Twitty (real name: Harold Jenkins) country rock singer, 59
June 9 – Arthur Alexander, country soul singer, 53
June 10 – Arleen Auger, American operatic soprano, 53 (brain tumor)
June 13 – John Campbell, blues guitarist, 41 (heart failure)
June 24 – Wong Ka Kui, co-founder of the Hong Kong rock band Beyond, 31 (stage accident)
June 28 – GG Allin, punk singer, 36 (heroin overdose)
July 7 – Mia Zapata (The Gits), 27 (murdered)
July 14 – Léo Ferré, French singer, songwriter and composer, 76
July 19 – Szymon Goldberg, Polish-born American violinist and conductor, 84
July 21 – Richard Tee, pianist and singer, 49 (prostate cancer)
August 5 – Eugen Suchoň, Slovak composer, 84
August 7 – Roy Budd, jazz pianist and film composer, 46 (brain haemorrhage)
August 10 – Øystein Aarseth, aka Euronymous, black metal guitarist of Mayhem fame, 25 (murdered)
August 17 – Phil Seymour, drummer, guitarist and singer, 41 (cancer)
August 21 – Tatiana Troyanos, operatic mezzo-soprano, 54 (breast cancer)
August 25 – Janna Allen, songwriter, 36 (leukemia)
August 26 – Rockin' Dopsie, zydeco accordionist and singer, 61
September 9 – Helen O'Connell, singer, actress and dancer, 73
September 22 – Maurice Abravanel, conductor, 90
September 24 – Ian Stuart Donaldson, musician, frontman of Skrewdriver, 36 (car crash)
October 23 – Elena Nicolai, opera singer, 88
October 31 – River Phoenix, actor and singer of Aleka's Attic, 23 (drug overdose)
November 3 – Léon Theremin, inventor of the Theremin musical instrument, 97
November 6 – Torsten Fenslau, (Culture Beat), 29 (car accident)
November 7 – Adelaide Hall, jazz singer, actress, entertainer, 92
November 11 – Erskine Hawkins, trumpet player and bandleader, 79
November 16 – Lucia Popp, Slovak operatic soprano, 54 (brain cancer)
November 18 – Arvid Fladmoe, Norwegian composer and conductor, 78
November 20 – Sidney Griller, violinist and founder of the Griller Quartet, 82
November 22 – Anthony Burgess, composer and polymath best known as a novelist, 76
November 24 – Albert Collins, blues guitarist and singer, 61 (cancer)
November 26 – César Guerra-Peixe, violinist and composer, 79
November 30 – David Houston, singer, 57 (brain aneurysm)
December 1 – Ray Gillen, former vocalist of Black Sabbath and Badlands, 34 (AIDS-related)
December 4 – Frank Zappa, "Mothers of Invention" musician/composer, 52 (prostate cancer)
December 5 – Doug Hopkins, guitarist and songwriter for Gin Blossoms, 32 (suicide)
December 12 – Joan Cross, operatic soprano, 93
December 19 – Michael Clarke, drummer (The Byrds), 47

Awards

Filmfare Awards
Kumar Sanu – Filmfare Best Male Playback Award
Alka Yagnik & Ila Arun win the Filmfare Best Female Playback Award

Grammy Awards
1993 Grammy Awards

Country Music Association Awards
1993 Country Music Association Awards

Country Music Hall of Fame
Willie Nelson

Eurovision Song Contest
Eurovision Song Contest 1993

Japan Record Awards
35th Japan Record Awards

Mercury Music Prize
Suede – Suede wins.

Glenn Gould Prize
Oscar Peterson (laureate), Benny Green (protégé)

Rock and Roll Hall of Fame
The Doors, Cream, Creedence Clearwater Revival, Sly and the Family Stone, Etta James, Van Morrison, Ruth Brown and Frankie Lymon and the Teenagers

Charts

Triple J Hottest 100

See also
 1993 in British music
 Record labels established in 1993

References

 
20th century in music
Music by year